Black Book, Black book or Blackbook may refer to:

Film 
 Black Book (film), a 2006 Dutch thriller film by director Paul Verhoeven
 Black Book (soundtrack), soundtrack of the 2006 film
 The Black Book (serial), a 1929 American drama film serial
 The Black Book, alternative name for the 1949 American drama film Reign of Terror, set in the French Revolution
 The Black Book (2018 film), a 2018 Portuguese film directed by Valeria Sarmiento

Literature

Non-fiction 
 The Black Book (list), the list of people to be arrested by the Gestapo following a planned Nazi invasion of Britain in the Second World War
 The Black Book (Morrison book), a 1974 book by Toni Morrison
 The Black Book of Polish Jewry, a 1943 statement of the Association of Jewish Refugees and Immigrants from Poland on the Holocaust of Polish Jews
 The Black Book of Poland, a 1942 summary of the Nazi German atrocities in occupied Poland published by the Polish Ministry of Information
 The Black Book of Soviet Jewry, a compilation of documentary reports about the actions of Nazis against Jews in Eastern Europe during the Holocaust
 The Black Book: Imbalance of Power and Wealth in the Sudan, a 2000 dissident publication
 The Black Book of Capitalism, a book that assigns blame for what it argues are historic repressions to capitalism
 The Black Book of Colonialism, a book documenting evils that it attributes to colonialism
 The Black Book of English Canada, a 2001 book detailing evils that it attributes to English-speaking Canada
 The Black Book of Communism, a 1999 book that catalogs crimes that it argues resulted from the pursuit of communism
 Berlin Black Book owned by Prince of Albania, compiled during World War I by Germany and allegedly containing long list of British perverts, described in the 1918 article by Harold Spencer published by Noel Pemberton-Billing
Talaat Pasha's Black Book, or The Remaining Documents of Talaat Pasha, a 2008 book by Murat Bardakçı
The Black Book, a catalog of American precancel stamps
Black Book of Pushbacks, a book about abuse of migrants in the Balkans compiled by Border Violence Monitoring Network

Creative writing 
 The Black Book (Durrell novel), a 1938 novel by Lawrence Durrell
 The Black Book (Pamuk novel), a 1990 novel by Turkish novelist Orhan Pamuk
 The Black Book (Rankin novel), a 1993 novel by Scottish writer Ian Rankin
 Black Book (novel), a 2006 novel derived from the 2006 film Black Book
 The Black Book (Patterson novel), a 2017 novel by James Patterson and David Ellis
 BlackBook,  an arts and culture magazine

Manuscripts 
 Black Book of Carmarthen, one of the earliest surviving manuscripts written entirely in Welsh
 Yazidi Black Book, one of the two holy books of the Yazidi religion (Kurdish language)
 Black Book of Clanranald, on Clan history, literature and poems

Television 
 "The Black Book" (Garfield and Friends), a 1989 episode of Garfield and Friends
 "The Black Book" (Rebus), a 2006 episode in the Inspector Rebus series
 Black Books, a British sitcom

Other uses 
 Black Book (National Auto Research), a vehicle appraisal service
 Black Book (gambling), a nickname for a list of individuals blacklisted from casinos
 Black books of hours, Flemish illuminated manuscripts, created on black dyed vellum.
 Black Book (video game), an adventure role-playing video game
 A traditional or Wiccan name for a grimoire, the personal guide book to ritual kept by every practicing witch, or other text instructing in magic
 Black book, a slang term for a graffiti artist's notebook or sketchbook
 Black books, records of Lincoln's Inn, a barristers association in London
 The Black Book (album)

See also 
Address book
 Black Book of the Admiralty, a collection of medieval maritime law
 Book of Negroes, a 1783 list of the Black Loyalists, those African Americans who fought for the British Crown
 Liber Niger (disambiguation), Latin for "Black Book"
 Little black book (disambiguation)
 Blue book
Blue Book (disambiguation)
 Green Book (disambiguation)
 Orange Book (disambiguation)
 Pink Book (disambiguation)
 Plum Book
 White book (disambiguation)
 Yellow Book (disambiguation)